"Hit 'Em High (The Monstars' Anthem)" is a single performed by B-Real, Coolio, Method Man, LL Cool J, and Busta Rhymes from the Space Jam Soundtrack. Though the movie received mixed reviews, the soundtrack was popular. It failed to reach the Billboard Hot 100, but was successful in the United Kingdom. The video, directed by Hype Williams, is in black and white and features scenes from the movie, mostly the Monstars. The rappers wore the Monstars' jerseys from the movie while rapping on a basketball court.

Personnel
 Produced, Mixed and Drum Programming by Poke and Tone
 Mix Engineer: Bill Esses at Chung King Studios

Recorded at Encore Studios and The Hit Factory

Track listing

A-Side
"Hit 'Em High (The Monstars' Anthem)" (Extended Mix) – 4:41
"Hit 'Em High" (Extended Track Masters Remix) – 4:23

B-Side
"Hit 'Em High" (Original Instrumental) – 4:16
"Hit 'Em High" (Track Masters Remix Instrumental) – 4:21

Chart performance

Weekly charts

Year-end charts

References

 

1997 singles
Atlantic Records singles
Method Man songs
Busta Rhymes songs
LL Cool J songs
Coolio songs
1996 songs
Looney Tunes songs
Songs written for films
Songs written for animated films
Songs written by LL Cool J
Songs written by Busta Rhymes
Music videos directed by Hype Williams
Songs written by Jean-Claude Olivier
Song recordings produced by Trackmasters
Songs written by Method Man
Songs written by Samuel Barnes (songwriter)
Posse cuts
Black-and-white music videos
Songs written by B-Real
Songs written by Coolio
Space Jam